Kansiime Kubiryaba Anne (born 13 April 1986) and popularly known as Anne Kansiime, is a Ugandan entertainer, comedian, and actress. She has been referred to as "Africa's Queen of Comedy" by some African media outlets.

Background and education
She was born in Mparo in present-day Rukiga District, in the Western Region of Uganda. At the time of her birth, Mparo was part of Kabale District. Her father is a retired banker, and her mother is a housewife. Kansiime attended Kabale Primary School. For her O-Level and A-Level education, she studied at Bweranyangi Girls' Senior Secondary School in Bushenyi. She holds a Bachelor of Arts in Social Science from Makerere University.

Career
Beginning in 2007, while still an undergraduate at Makerere University, Kansiime began to participate in drama skits acted by the theatre group Theatre Factory, who played at the Uganda National Theatre in Kampala's central business district. When Theatre Factory disintegrated, she joined Fun Factory, that replaced it. The group plays every 
Thursday evening. The best skits were broadcast on NTV Uganda in the Barbed Wire TV show that later became U-Turn. She partnered with Brian Mulondo as a Taxi interview conductor in the MiniBuzz series and provided comic video dramatizations of topical issues that random passengers discussed.

According to recorded interviews that she gave in 2014, Anne began posting some of her sketch comedy skits on YouTube. She received positive feedback and that encouraged her to post more videos. Her screen breakthrough came when Citizen TV from neighboring Kenya offered her a slot to produce, star and present a comedy show once a week. That is how she came up with the Don't Mess With Kansiime comedy show. As of November 2014, her YouTube channel had amassed more than 15 million views. Her YouTube videos receive thousands of views and she has appeared on BBC Focus on Africa. She has played to packed houses in Blantyre, Gaborone, Kigali, Kuala Lumpur, Lagos, Lilongwe, London, Lusaka and Harare.

Other considerations
Even amongst various acting commitments, Kansiime has continued performing and touring as a standup comedian. Kansiime's comedy style tends to focus on aspects of her personal life. "I like talking about things that are going on in life, because that's always going to be different and original," she says. She is married to Gerald Ojok, a native Acholi. In Nov 2017, there were rumours that she divorced her husband. They have no children, as of February 2015. At that time, she was in the process of compiling an album of Children's songs, which she intends to release later in 2015.

Filmography

Awards
 Honorary recognition by the SIIKETV Rising Star Academy Awards, the "Queen of Comedy" 2018
 Comedy YouTube Sub-Saharan Africa Creator Award 2016
 Outstanding Female Comedian 2016
 Teeniez Funniest Comedian 2016
 African Entertainment Awards USA, Best Comedian's Award 2015
 Rising Star – Comedian of the Year 2015
 African Oscar Award for favorite comedian 2015
 Nollywood & African People's Choice Award for favorite comedian 2015
 YouTube silver play button 2015
 AIRTEL Women of Substance Awards 2014
 BEFFTA 2013 (Best Comedian) Winner
 Lagos International Festival 2013 (Best Actress) Winner
 Social Media Awards (Favorite Celebrity) winner
 African Social Awards Malaysia (ASAM) – 2013

Charity
Anne Kansiime through her charity organisation, The Kansiime Foundation,  supports needy but bright children by keeping them in school. She now supports over 35 children both in Primary and Secondary school.

Business
Anne Kansiime is also into leisure business. She runs Kansiime Backpackers and it is located on the shores of lake Bunyonyi, conveniently overseeing the lake Bunyonyi in Kabale District, Uganda.

References

External links
Official Website 
Anne Kansiime on YouTube
Kansiime Backpackers 
The Kansiime Foundation 
Keeping Up with Kansiime
Kansiime’s Three Habits for Success 
  Kansiime Anne’s London interview on The Sporah Show (VIDEO)

1986 births
Living people
Makerere University alumni
21st-century Ugandan actresses
Ugandan writers
Ugandan women comedians
People from Rukiga District
People from Western Region, Uganda
Ugandan YouTubers
People educated at Bweranyangi Girls' Senior Secondary School
Ugandan stage actresses